Gone Fishing is the 2009 hip hop mixtape by Midwest rap duo The Cool Kids, and their second official mixtape after 2007's That's Stupid!. The album was executive produced by Jonathan "J.P." Keller and Chuck Inglish, while the album was mixed by Don Cannon. The mixtape was released on May 5, 2009, as an appetizer for their forthcoming album When Fish Ride Bicycles.

Reception

The mixtape was noted for its "electro banging beats and funny lyrics". The Chicago Reader noted that "the songs are ambitious and fully formed, showing a lot of range without sacrificing accessibility". According to FFWD's Garth Paulson, "The tape features the usual lackadaisical attitude, geeky references and early hip-hop idolization that rapidly sparks arguments over whether the Chicago duo is a breath of fresh air or willingly stale." Village Voice'''s Zach Baron said of the mixtape: "Inglish's beats are exactly as bass-thick, synth-wide, sample-heavy, and ambling as the duo's throwback raps, which here are in fine form." Pitchfork Media compared Gone Fishing unfavorably with The Bake Sale, suggesting it may be "a collection of castoffs that weren't good enough to make When Fish Ride Bicycles''", but conceded that "Even when they're on autopilot, their icy flatness has style."

Track listing
 Introduction to Ice Fishing
 Hammer Brothers
 Champions
 Gold Links
 Cinnamon
 Premium Blends (featuring Shorty K)
 Step Back
 Jump Rope (featuring Tennille)
 The Last Stretch (featuring Jahda)
 The Art of Noise (interlude)
 The Light Company
 Popcorn
 Wise Words by GLC - told by GLC
 Pennies (The Updated Rosters Remix) (featuring Ludacris & Bun B)
 Broadcast Live
 Taking A Break Interlude
 Tune Up
 Weekend Girls Interlude (featuring Ryan Leslie & The S.O.S. Band)
 Summer Vacation
 Words of Wisdom by GLC - told by GLC
 Knocked Down

References

2009 mixtape albums
Albums produced by Chuck Inglish
Albums produced by Don Cannon
The Cool Kids albums